Beipan River Hukun Expressway Bridge is a suspension bridge near Guanling, on the border of the Anshun Prefecture, Guizhou, China. The bridge has a main span of 636 metres and is part of the G60 Shanghai–Kunming Expressway crossing the Beipan River. It stands at a height of 318 metres above the river, placing it amongst the 15 highest bridges in the world.

See also
List of highest bridges in the world
List of longest suspension bridge spans
Beipan River Guanxing Highway Bridge
Beipan River Shuibai Railway Bridge

External links

 on HighestBridges.com
Bridges in Guizhou
Suspension bridges in China
Bridges completed in 2008
2008 establishments in China
Bridges over the Beipan River